Dokuzparinsky District is an administrative and municipal district (raion), one of the forty-one in the Republic of Dagestan, Russia. It is located in the south of the republic, being the southernmost district of Russia. Its administrative center is the rural locality (a selo) of Usukhchay. As of the 2010 Census, the total population of the district was 15,357, with the population of Usukhchay accounting for 12.2% of that number.

Administrative and municipal status
Within the framework of administrative divisions, Dokuzparinsky District is one of the forty-one in the Republic of Dagestan. The district is divided into two selsoviets which comprise sixteen rural localities. As a municipal division, the district is incorporated as Dokuzparinsky Municipal District. Its two selsoviets are incorporated as nine rural settlements within the municipal district. The selo of Usukhchay serves as the administrative center of both the administrative and municipal district.

References

Notes

Sources

Districts of Dagestan
